A Dream in the Dark: Two Decades of Okkervil River Live is a live box set by American rock band Okkervil River. The box set was released by ATO Records on October 30, 2020, composed of 24 tracks (on 4 discs). It was released electronically on 18 September 2020. Like other Okkervil River albums, the accompanying artwork is the work of artist William Schaff, and references several other Okkervil River album covers. The title refers to a line from "Unless It's Kicks".

Background
In April 2019, Okkervil River announced A Dream in the Dark, a series of twelve live albums, digitally recorded from thoughtout the band's history, to be released monthly to subscribers. In September 2020, it was announced that a condensed version including highlights from the series was to be released as a single album.

Track listing
All tracks are written by Will Sheff.

References

2020 live albums
2020 compilation albums
ATO Records live albums
Warner Records compilation albums
Okkervil River albums